Hanway is a surname. Notable people with the surname include:

Franklin Hanway, American politician
Jonas Hanway (1712–1786), English traveller and philanthropist
Mary Ann Hanway, 18th-century English writer and novelist
T. Littleton Hanway (died 1921), American politician and merchant
Tom Hanway (born 1961), American musician

See also
HanWay Films, a British film distributor